The Château de Lassay is a 15th-century castle in Lassay-les-Châteaux, in the Mayenne department.

History
The first mention of a castrum in Lassay dates back to the 12th century. Owned by Charles de Vendôme at the beginning of the 15th century, the castle is destroyed by French troops since Charles de Vendôme was supporting the English during the Hundred Years War.

In 1458, the French king Charles VII allowed the son of Charles de Vendôme, Jean II, to rebuild a castle. The new castle was achieve within one year. The barbican was built in 1497-1498.

Since then, the castle was left mainly intact and the original 15th-century architecture preserved by the different owners of the castle.

The castle is listed as a Monument historique since 1862. It is open for the visit from April to September.

Architecture

See also
 List of castles in France

References

Bibliography
 Eugène Lefèvre-Pontalis, « Le Château de Lassay (Mayenne) », Bulletin monumental, Paris / Caen, A. Picard / H. Delesques, vol. 69, 1904, p. 3-40 Read online.
 Château de Lassay, notice historique, Impr. Europe media publications, 53110 Lassay-les-Châteaux.

External links

http://chateaudelassay.fr

Castles in Pays de la Loire
Monuments historiques of Pays de la Loire
Tourist attractions in Mayenne